Thetystrombus is a genus of sea snails, marine gastropod mollusks in the family Strombidae, the true conchs.

Species
Species within the genus Thetystrombus include:
 † Thetystrombus coronatus (Defrance, 1827) 
 † Thetystrombus exbonellii (Sacco, 1893) 
 † Thetystrombus inflexus (Eichwald, 1830) 
 † Thetystrombus lapugyensis (Sacco, 1893) 
 Thetystrombus latus (Gmelin, 1791)
 † Thetystrombus pannonicus (Harzhauser & Kronenberg, 2013)

References

 Bandel K. (2007) About the larval shell of some Stromboidea, connected to a review of the classification and phylogeny of the Strombimorpha (Caenogastropoda). Freiberger Forschungshefte, ser. C 524: 97-206.
 Dekkers A.M. (2008). Revision of the family Strombidae (Gastropoda)on the supraspecific level. Part One. De Kreukel. 44(3): 35–64.
 Maxwell S.J., Dekkers A.M., Rymer T.L. & Congdon B.C. (2020). Towards resolving the American and West African Strombidae (Mollusca: Gastropoda: Neostromboidae) using integrated taxonomy. The Festivus. 52(1): 3-38.

Strombidae